Wiesław Stanisław Gawłowski (19 May 1950 – 14 November 2000) was a Polish volleyball player and coach, a member of the Poland national team. With his national team, he won the titles of the 1976 Olympic Champion and the 1974 World Champion.

Personal life
Wiesław Gawłowski was born in Tomaszów Mazowiecki, Poland. He attended the University of Physical Education in Warsaw, graduating in 1974. He had wife Barbara and two sons – Maciej and Wojciech.

Honours

Clubs
 CEV European Champions Cup 
  1977/1978 – with Płomień Milowice
 National championships
 1976/1977  Polish Championship, with Płomień Milowice
 1978/1979  Polish Championship, with Płomień Milowice

Death
Wiesław Gawłowski died in a car crash in Białobrzegi near Płock.

External links
 
 
 Player profile at LegaVolley.it   
 Player profile at Volleybox.net

1950 births
2000 deaths
People from Tomaszów Mazowiecki
Polish men's volleyball players
Olympic volleyball players of Poland
Volleyball players at the 1972 Summer Olympics
Volleyball players at the 1976 Summer Olympics
Volleyball players at the 1980 Summer Olympics
Olympic gold medalists for Poland
Olympic medalists in volleyball
Medalists at the 1976 Summer Olympics
Polish expatriate sportspeople in Italy
Expatriate volleyball players in Italy